Blue squill is a common name for several plants and may refer to:

Chamaescilla corymbosa
Craspedia glauca
Dampiera linearis
Hyacinthoides non-scripta
Merwilla plumbea
Puschkina scilloides libanotica
Scilla siberica
Trillium grandiflorum
Zantedeschia jucunda

Many of these are grown as ornamental plants and it seems likely that blue squill is a particularly popular name among plant breeders.  Others are local names from different parts of the world.

References